The Geelong line is a regional passenger rail service operated by V/Line in Victoria, Australia. It serves passengers between state capital Melbourne and the regional city of Geelong.

According to V/Line it carries more passengers than any other regional rail line in Australia.

History
V/Line commuter services to Geelong once terminated at Geelong station, being extended to the existing South Geelong station in 1968, and to the newly rebuilt Marshall station in 2005. 

In February 1959 the line from North Geelong to Corio was duplicated. The line from Werribee to Little River was duplicated in October 1970. In June 1981, the line to Lara was duplicated and the platform at Lara converted into an island platform, while the Little River station got a second platform.

Construction of Waurn Ponds railway station was completed in 2014 and opened on 12 October, extending Geelong line services to Waurn Ponds.

There have been calls to electrify the line, but plans were put on hold by the State Government in 2002, with Diesel locomotives and railcars utilised instead. Train services between Melbourne and Geelong received a government funded upgrade under the Regional Fast Rail project between 2004 and 2005, with new high speed VLocity railcars manufactured by Bombardier in Dandenong entering service to Geelong in early 2006. 

Prior to the opening of the Regional Rail Link, services ran every 20 minutes during weekdays and hourly later at night, with more frequent services during peak. Services operated every 40 minutes on weekends. In December 2013, after the opening of the first section of Regional Rail Link between Southern Cross and South Kensington, Geelong trains no longer stopped at North Melbourne. From 21 June 2015, Geelong trains commenced running via the Deer Park–West Werribee line, no longer using the original line via Werribee and Newport.

As part of stage 1 of Western Rail Plan's Geelong Fast Rail, a new dedicated express track for Geelong services between Werribee and Laverton is being planned. Construction will begin in 2023. It is planned that Geelong services will resume running via the Werribee line when the project is completed. Some Geelong services will continue to run on the existing Sunshine corridor (Regional Rail Link) to allow connections to the Melbourne Airport rail link. The final service plan of Geelong services will be announced at a later date.

Services

Services on the Geelong line operate to a variety of stopping patterns during the weekday peak, to a frequency of 6 to 36 minutes depending on the station.

Outside the peak period, services operate to a 20-minute frequency, alternating between two stopping patterns:
 to or from  Waurn Ponds, skipping Corio, Little River, Ardeer and stations between Sunshine, Footscray and Southern Cross - stopping all other stations
 to or from  South Geelong, skipping North Shore, Ardeer and stations between Sunshine, Footscray and Southern Cross - stopping all other stations 

During the weekends, services operate to a 40-minute frequency, with the vast majority originating and terminating at   Waurn Ponds. These services skip Ardeer, and stations between Sunshine, Footscray and Southern Cross. Some services are filled by Warrnambool line services, which operates to different stopping patterns.

Almost all services are run using VLocity railcars, but some locomotive-hauled N-class carriages are also used. 70-year-old S-class carriages were used until 2010.

Performance
In the late 2000s and early 2010s, trains on the Geelong – Melbourne corridor were chronically late. As of March 2010, trains had officially run late for 44 consecutive months on the Geelong line.
The poor performance of V/Line was well documented in the local Geelong press.
Recurring issues on the line included poor communication, commuters worried about losing their jobs in Melbourne due to delays and overcrowding.

Since the opening of the Regional Rail Link in 2015, punctuality has generally improved.

See also
 Geelong and Melbourne Railway Company
 V/Line

References

External links 

 http://www.vline.com.au
 Rail Geelong: Line History

V/Line rail services
Transport in Geelong
Transport in Barwon South West (region)